Langkho, Laangkher, or Linkhay is a town and seat of Langkho Township and Langkho District, in the Shan State of eastern Burma. It is located east of Wān Long. It is served by Langhko Airport and is accessed along the National Road 45. A bridge in the vicinity crossing the Nam Teng River the town lies on is called Nam Kok Bridge. This town is famous for being the subject of the song "Langkho A Win", written by Sai Htee Saing.

History
A deep channel in the area is called the Nam Teng and existed at least before 1906.

In 1940, Reverend S.W. Short and his wife set up a mission at Langhko and returned to visit it after World War II. Historically Langhko was very corrupt, occupied in the opium trade. In 1952 the town was known to be involved in tobacco production and contained a pipe making factory. The Burmese Army occupied Langkho and burned nearby villages and dispersed families to cut off aid to the Shan rebels.

References

External links
Maplandia World Gazetteer

Populated places in Langhko District
Langhko Township
Township capitals of Myanmar